is a 1984 Japanese film directed by Shinichirō Sawai, based on the novel by Shizuko Natsuki (published in English under the title Murder at Mt. Fuji). At the 9th Japan Academy Prize it won three awards and received three other nominations.

Plot
Natsuki's original book W no Higeki, the story of a rich family torn apart by the murder of their patriarch, and their heiress being accused of the crime, becomes a play and is acted out by a troupe of actors in Osaka. The role of the heroine is contended for by young Shizuka Mita (Yakushimaru), who dreams of fame and fortune. Shizuka is taken under the wing of famous actress Sho Hatori (Y. Mita), whose rich patron died in her arms one night, and who agrees to let Shizuka stand in for her. As the play is acted out, Shizuka realizes that many scenes in the play begin to have parallels with real life...

The film takes the form of a story within a story, in which the original book's characters are acted out by the film's characters.

Cast 
 Hiroko Yakushimaru as Shizuka Mita, who plays rich heiress Mako Watsuji on stage
 Yoshiko Mita as Sho Hatori, who plays Mako's mother Yoshie Watsuji
 Masanori Sera as Akio Morita, Shizuka's boyfriend and mentor off stage
 Kunihiko Mitamura as Jun Godai, who plays investigator Ukyo Nakazato
 Miho Takagi as Kaori Kikuchi, the actress Shizuka relegated from the Mako role
 Ken Nishida as Koji Shirota, who plays Shohei Mazaki, the victim's doctor 
 Kōjirō Kusanagi as Kaichi Kiuchi, who plays Shigeru Watsuji, Mako's grand-uncle

Theme song
 "Woman (W no Higeki) Yori", original lyrics by Takashi Matsumoto, vocals by Hiroko Yakushimaru.

This song has also been covered by Yumi Matsutoya, Yūko Andō, Akina Nakamori and Ken Hirai, the latter version being used for the 2012 iteration of the book's story into a TV drama.

Awards and nominations 
9th Japan Academy Prize 
Won: Best Director - Shinichirō Sawai
Won: Best Actress in a Supporting Role - Yoshiko Mita
Won: Best Sound Recording - Fumio Hashimoto
Nominated: Best Picture
Nominated: Best Screenplay - Haruhiko Arai and Shinichirō Sawai
Nominated: Best Actress - Hiroko Yakushimaru

27th Blue Ribbon Awards
Won: Best Actress - Hiroko Yakushimaru

10th Hochi Film Award 
Won: Best Supporting Actress - Yoshiko Mita

7th Yokohama Film Festival 
3rd Best Film

References

External links 
 

1984 films
1984 drama films
Films based on Japanese novels
Films scored by Joe Hisaishi
Films directed by Shinichirō Sawai
Japanese drama films
Joe Hisaishi albums
Toei Company films
Films with screenplays by Haruhiko Arai
1980s Japanese films
1980s Japanese-language films